This is a list of diplomatic missions of the Nordic countries, which consists of Denmark, Finland, Iceland, Norway, and Sweden. In some countries, all or some of the Nordic countries have joint embassies. Examples includes the Nordic Embassies in Berlin (all the Nordic countries), the Nordic House in Yangon (Denmark, Finland, Norway and Sweden) and the Nordic Embassy in Dhaka (Denmark, Norway and Sweden).

The countries cooperate closely, and the Helsinki Treaty sets the framework for the Nordic cooperation in the Nordic Council and the Nordic Council of Ministers. According to the Helsinki Treaty, public officials in the foreign services of any of the Nordic countries are to assist citizens of another Nordic country if that country is not represented in the territory concerned. There are also common Nordic instructions on consular co-operation, and on strengthening of the consular contingency co-operation.

Co-operation in the foreign service is one of the proposals in the so-called Stoltenberg report, prepared on behalf of the Nordic foreign ministers. In 2019, a group of researchers from the Nordic foreign policy institutes evaluated whether the report's proposals had been followed up in practice. They judged that there had been significant progress in co-operation between the foreign services. A 2020 report by Björn Bjarnason, appointed by the Nordic foreign ministers, reports on ways the Nordic countries can work more closely together on foreign and defence policy. Some proposed measures are a common Nordic diplomacy and an enhanced role of diplomatic missions

The Nordic countries have also signed a memorandum of understanding with the Baltic states on the posting of diplomats at each other's missions abroad, under the auspices of Nordic-Baltic Eight.

Africa

Americas

Asia

Europe

Oceania

Multilateral organizations

Nordic Council of Ministers' Offices 
The Nordic Council of Ministers is the official body for inter-governmental co-operation. The Council of Ministers has offices in the following countries: 

Closed offices

See also

Notes

References

External links

Ministry of Foreign Affairs of Denmark
Ministry for Foreign Affairs of Iceland
Ministry for Foreign Affairs of Finland
Ministry of Foreign Affairs of Norway
Ministry for Foreign Affairs of Sweden

Nordic countries
 
 
 
 
 
Lists of diplomatic missions by sending country
Diplomatic missions
Diplomatic missions
Diplomatic missions
Diplomatic missions
Diplomatic missions